The Tupuri are an ethnic group in Cameroon and Chad. They speak a language called Tupuri, which had 125,000 speakers in Cameroon at an unspecified date and 90,785 speakers in Chad in 1993. There were 215,466 of them in Chad in 2009.

In Cameroon, the Tupuri live east of Kaélé in the Kaele division and in the Kar-Hay subdivision of the Mayo-Danay division of the Far North Province. In Chad, Tupuri live near Fianga, Fianga Subprefecture, Mayo-Kebbi Prefecture in the southwest of the country. 

The Tupuri are known for a dance called the gourna, "the dance of the cock", which involves the dancers forming a circle and holding long sticks.

The Tupuri political and religious life is headed by the Wang Doré, the traditional Kings of Doré, who are based in the village of Doré near Fianga, Chad.

Notes

References
 Chrispin, Pettang, directeur, Cameroun: Guide touristique. Paris: Les Éditions Wala.
 Gordon, Raymond G., Jr. (ed.) (2005): "Tupuri". Ethnologue: Languages of the World, 15th ed. Dallas: SIL International. Accessed 7 June 2006.
 West, Ben (2004). Cameroon: The Bradt Travel Guide. Guilford, Connecticut: The Globe Pequot Press Inc.